Gheyuk (also Romanized as Gheyūk and Gheyūg; also known as Gheyb and Ghībk) is a village in Alqurat Rural District, in the Central District of Birjand County, South Khorasan Province, Iran. According to the 2006 census, it consisted of 65 families and had a population of 171 people.

References 

Populated places in Birjand County